Khant is a small village in the Khamanon tehsil of Fatehgarh Sahib district in Punjab, India. Maanpur is just 0.6 km away in the east so they often called Khant Maanpur, together. A noted Punjabi singer-songwriter and actor, Babbu Maan, belongs to the village.

Geography 

Morinda (Rupnagar district) is the nearest city. The tehsil main town and the nearest police station, Khamanon, is just 8 km away in the west. Prem Pura, Kajauli, Panecha and Pohlo Majra are the surrounding villages.

See also 
Babbu Maan
Buttar Sarinh
Raipur

References 

Fatehgarh Sahib district
Villages in Fatehgarh Sahib district